Ferhat Güven (born 22 August 1983) is a Norwegian politician and a member of the Labour Party.

He served as a deputy representative to the Parliament of Norway from Sør-Trøndelag during the 2013–2017 term. He was elected to the Trondheim city council in 2011, and was born in Turkey.

References

1983 births
Living people
Turkish emigrants to Norway
Norwegian people of Turkish descent
Deputy members of the Storting
Labour Party (Norway) politicians
Politicians from Trondheim
21st-century Norwegian politicians